These are lists of the world's most expensive cities for expatriate employees (not residents), according to the Mercer, ECA International and Xpatulator.com   cost-of-living surveys. Other surveys from online collaborative indices, such as Numbeo, Expatistan, or Eardex are not covered by this article.

Various factors enter into a city's cost-of-living for expatriate employees, such as monetary value, consumer confidence, investment, interest rates, exchange rates of the country's currency, and housing costs. This list does not account for cost-of-living savings accrued to local citizens through government-subsidized housing, health care, education, differences in taxation, and many other factors irrelevant to expatriates. Cost of living may be much higher for expatriates than for local residents in a developing country, especially if expatriates expect a standard of living similar to a developed country.

Mercer 

Mercer's Cost of Living surveys are taken in March of each year. The survey covers 207 cities around the world and measures the comparative cost of over 200 items in each location, including housing, transport, food, clothing, household goods and entertainment. It is designed to help multinational companies and governments determine compensation allowances for their expatriate employees. New York is used as the base city and all other cities are compared against it. The cost of housing plays an important part in determining where cities are ranked.

Two main factors determine a city’s ranking in Mercer’s survey – the relative strength of the relevant currency against the US dollar over the prior 12 months and price movements over the prior 12 months compared to those in New York City as the base.

ECA International 

Every March and September, ECA International calculates the cost of living for expatriates in almost 400 cities around the world. The survey does not include certain living costs such as accommodation, utilities (electricity, gas, water costs), car purchase and school fees. These are usually compensated for separately in expatriate packages from cost of living allowances.

See also 
 Global city
 List of cities by GDP
 Megacity
 Most livable cities
 Worldwide ERC

References

Cities-related lists of superlatives
Moving and relocation
Economies by city
Cities For Expatriate Employees
Expatriates